USS LSM(R)-189 was a LSM(R)-188 class Landing Ship Medium (rocket) of the United States Navy during World War II. She was commanded by Lieutenant James Malcolm Stewart, USNR during the Battle of Okinawa.

Service history
During World War II, LSM(R)-189 was assigned to the Asiatic-Pacific Theater and participated in the assault and occupation of Okinawa Gunto, from 26 March to 3 June 1945.

The ship was damaged when struck by a Japanese kamikaze aircraft on 12 April 1945 while on radar picket duty off Okinawa.

Decommissioned on 31 January 1946, she was sold for scrap on 17 February 1948 to the National Metal and Steel Corporation, Terminal Island, California.

LSM(R)-189 was awarded the Navy Unit Commendation for her actions off Okinawa and one battle star for World War II service.

Life Magazine Centerfold 

The LSM(R) was heralded in Life Magazine in 1945 with a centerfold picture. "Each of these tiny ships had amazing firepower, greater at short range than the combined firepower of two mammoth Iowa class battleships", ran the caption. The interim group of 12 LSM(R)s transited the Panama Canal and via San Diego, Honolulu, and the Philippines, headed for battle against Japan in March 1945. Unaware of their destination, the crews were nonetheless well equipped and trained. In a preliminary assault on 26 March 1945, they laid down a rocket barrage at dawn on Kerama Retta, a small cluster of islands off the southwestern shore of Okinawa. Their objective: to allow the Marines to swiftly land and secure the islands and harbor for the protection of hospital, supply and communication ships, and floating drydocks. The early dawn assault surprised the Japanese. The Marines took control with a minimum of casualties and established this haven for damaged ships.

Okinawa Radar Picket Line
The American plan for defense against the kamikazes was to have fighters intercept the Japanese as early as possible. Sixteen radar picket stations were established around the island, in some cases almost 100 miles out, to give early warning of the Japanese planes which might be coming from any direction. Each station was manned around the clock by a handful of ships ranging from destroyers to minesweepers. Their job was to sound the alarm and vector fighters on to the Japanese before they could attack the fleet anchored off Okinawa and the Allied forces and supply dumps ashore. Unfortunately, some of the eager-to-die Japanese wanted to attack the first American ships they saw: the pickets. Dennis L. Francis LSM Commander, Flotilla Nine for the period 12–26 April, Action Report indicated that: 
 These ships are not particularly suited for picket duty. Since their primary function is to deliver rockets during invasion operations, it seems feasible that subjecting them to continual enemy air attack will allow this secondary duty to seriously effect their ability to perform their primary function due to damage. They have no great value in combating enemy aircraft due to the absence of air search radar, adequate director control for the 5"/38 main battery and director control for the 40mm single guns. The fact that they carry a considerable quantity of explosive rockets in their magazines presents another hazard. In general, it is believed that assigning them to picket duty should be avoided since it means risking the operation of a limited number of specialized ships which could be performed by any number of other landing craft whose primary function is more closely coincident with screening operations. 

References
 
 Sheftall, M.G. (2005) Blossoms in the Wind: Human Legacies of the Kamikaze New York: NAL Caliber
 Stewart, James M. (2003) 90 Day Naval Wonder"
 LSM-LSMR Amphibious Forces Volume II, Turner Publishing Co. 1997
 John Lorelli To Foreign Shores: U.S. Amphibious Operations in World War II''1994
 Friedman, Norman (2002) "US Amphibious Ships and Crafts" Nacal Institute Press, Annapolis, MD

LSM(R)-188-class landing ships medium
1944 ships
World War II amphibious warfare vessels of the United States